Judith Freudberg (July 12, 1949 – June 10, 2012) was an American TV and film writer. She was born in Memphis, Tennessee, and graduated from Syracuse University with a degree in speech and dramatic arts. In 1971, she started working on Sesame Street, two years after the show's debut, as an assistant in the music department and became a writer for the children's television show in 1975. Freudberg worked on that show for 35 years and shared 17 daytime Emmys. One of the creators and developers of Elmo's World, she served as head writer for that popular segment.

Freudberg collaborated with Tony Geiss on Sesame Street's first feature film, Sesame Street Presents: Follow That Bird (1985) as well as An American Tail (1986) and The Land Before Time (1988), two feature animation films directed by Don Bluth and executive produced by Steven Spielberg. She and Molly Boylan were nominated for a Daytime Emmy for Outstanding Writing in a Children's Special for the home video Elmo's World: Wild Wild West (2001). For Sesame Street season 35, Freudberg co-wrote, with Lou Berger, the primetime special, Sesame Street Presents: The Street We Live On (2004), which was nominated for an Emmy as Outstanding Children's Program.

Freudberg died on June 10, 2012 in Manhattan at age 62 from complications of a brain tumor.

References

External links

1949 births
2012 deaths
Sesame Street crew
American television writers
American women television writers
Deaths from brain cancer in the United States